Yurt-e Kazem (also Romanized as Yūrt-e Kāz̧em, Yūrt Kāzem, Yowrd-e Kāz̧em, and Yūrd Kāzem; also known as Yūrt) is a village in Nilkuh Rural District in the Central District of Galikash County, Golestan Province, Iran. At the 2006 census, its population was 153, in 41 families.

References 

Populated places in Galikash County